Chōki or Choki is a Japanese name that may refer to:

, was a prince of the Ryukyu Kingdom
, a martial artist
, Japanese artist 
, aka Momokawa Chōki, a designer of ukiyo-e Japanese woodblock prints
, a prince of Ryukyu Kingdom
, a prince of the Ryukyu Kingdom 
, a prince of Ryukyu Kingdom
Modern Choki Chokies, a Japanese pop band

Choki may also refer to:

Choki, the kneeling posture
Choki, town in central Ethiopia.

See also

Chiki
Chocky, a 1968 science fiction novel
 Chocky (TV series), a 1984 children's television drama based on the novel

Japanese masculine given names